Mahazedi Pagoda is a prominent Buddhist pagoda in Bago, Myanmar.

History
The pagoda was built by King Bayinnaung in 1560 to house a gold and jewel-encrusted tooth relic of the Buddha. The tooth relic was, in fact, a fake replica from Dharmapala of Kotte, the king of the Kingdom of Kotte, who gifted the tooth, along with an alms bowl and his daughter. The relics arrived in 1576. In 1599, King Anaukpetlun conquered Bago and removed the relics to Taungoo. In 1636, King Thalun invaded Taungoo and removed the relics to Innwa, enshrining them at the Kaunghmudaw Pagoda in Sagaing. Throughout its history, the pagoda has been destroyed by several earthquakes on the Sagaing Fault, on 13 September 1564, 1583, and 8 October 1888, and completely leveled in 1930. Mahazedi Pagoda was rebuilt in the 1950s.

References

Pagodas in Myanmar
Buddhist temples in Myanmar
16th-century Buddhist temples
Religious buildings and structures completed in 1560